Lyndon Hannibal (born 20 November 1965) is a Sri Lankan international cricket umpire and a former first class cricketer. He stood as an umpire in the tour match between Sri Lanka Board President's XI vs Indian national cricket team in August 2015.

He stood in his first Twenty20 International (T20I) match, between Bangladesh and India in the 2018 Nidahas Trophy, on 8 March 2018. He stood in his first One Day International (ODI) match, between Sri Lanka and South Africa, on 8 August 2018.

In October 2019, he was appointed as one of the twelve umpires to officiate matches in the 2019 ICC T20 World Cup Qualifier tournament in the United Arab Emirates.

In 2021, he officiated in a Test series for the first time, as third umpire in the series between Sri Lanka and England.

See also
 List of One Day International cricket umpires
 List of Twenty20 International cricket umpires

References

External links
 

1965 births
Living people
Sri Lankan cricketers
Sri Lankan cricket umpires
Sri Lankan One Day International cricket umpires
Sri Lankan Twenty20 International cricket umpires
Sportspeople from Colombo